Ratlam Lok Sabha constituency (formerly, Jhabua Lok Sabha constituency) is one of the 29 Lok Sabha constituencies in Madhya Pradesh state in central India. This constituency is reserved for the candidates belonging to the Scheduled tribes. This constituency was renamed as Ratlam in 2008, following delimitation of the parliamentary constituencies. This constituency covers the entire Alirajpur and Jhabua districts and part of Ratlam district.

Vidhan Sabha segments
Presently, Ratlam Lok Sabha constituency comprises the following eight Vidhan Sabha (legislative assembly) constituencies:

Members of Lok Sabha

^ by poll

Election Results

General election 2019

By poll 2015

General election 2014

General election 2009

See also

 Alirajpur district
 Jhabua district
 Ratlam district
 List of Constituencies of the Lok Sabha

References

External links
Ratlam lok sabha  constituency election 2019 result details

Lok Sabha constituencies in Madhya Pradesh
Ratlam district
Jhabua district
Alirajpur district